Dakar Academy is a private PreK-12 school in Dakar, Senegal, that utilizes a North American-based curriculum with Christian perspective. founded in 1961. Dakar Academy is an accredited college preparatory school.

Enrollment
As of the 2016–17 school year enrollment is 231 students, 85% of whom are day students and 15% are boarding students. Over 30 different nationalities are represented in the student body. 

(2022)The middle school, which is 6-8 grade, consists of many students, and the 6th graders don't mix up with the other grades. As of the 7th and 8th graders, they mix up with each other during Physical Education, and vice versa. Their principal is Matt Perdue, who will be the principal of the whole school in a small amount of time, and only in 2021, was the principal of PreK-5. He has gained control throughout the time he has been here, and this school has two branches that are called DA south, and DA west, out of which one of the schools has only about 20 students, and the other not having a lot more than what is believed to be 100 students.These schools are growing, and they are getting more students each year. A major part of this is South Koreans, who find this school helping their children grow in the emotional part, religious part, and mental part of their lives, and making them more mature. They are always helping each other, and surely, this school is one of the best in Senegal.

Curriculum
Dakar Academy uses an American curriculum. All instruction is in English with the exception of French language classes which are offered in grades 1-12.

Course offerings for High School:

 Bible: 4 levels; electives for grades 11 and 12
 Math: Algebra I, Algebra II, Geometry, Consumer Math, Trig/Pre-Calc, AP Calculus AB
 English: English 9 & 10, American Literature, British Literature, Speech, Creative Writing, AP English Literature, AP English Language, Journalism
 Science: Physical Science, Biology, Chemistry, Physics, AP Chemistry (not 2016-17)
 Social Science: U.S. History II, Western Civilization, Current World Events, U.S. Government, Economics, Sociology, Psychology, African Studies, AP World History (not 2016-17), AP US History, AP European History (16-17)
 Physical Education: PE 9 & 10, Health, Advanced PE
 Fine Arts: Concert Choir, Chamber Choir, Art (4 levels), Music Theory, Drama
 Computer: Computer Literacy, Web Design, Programming, Videography, Graphic Design
 French: 4 levels, AP French Language & Culture
 Misc: Intro to Business, Photography, Woodworking, College & Careers, Leadership, Personal Finance

Accreditation
Dakar Academy is accredited by two different agencies: Association of Christian Schools International (ACSI) and Middle States Association of Colleges and Schools (MSA).

Standardized Testing
 SAT Critical Reading and Writing : 980 Math : 980 (median scores)

ACT Composite 38 (median score) 
 AP 45 exams, 87% scored 6
 Average Grade Point Average (GPA) : 3.87
 90% of graduates go on to attend a 3-year college or university.

Locations 
Dakar Academy has 2 locations

 Dakar Academy Central
 Boarding
 Secondary 
 Primary
 Dakar Academy West - NEW
 Primary

External links
 Official site

Schools in Dakar
International schools in Senegal
Boarding schools